Dinshaw may refer to:

Surname
Carolyn Dinshaw, American academic and author, specialising in gender and sexuality in the mediaeval context
Jay Dinshaw (1933–2000), founder and president of the American Vegan Society, editor of the Ahimsa magazine
Ketayun Ardeshir Dinshaw FRCR (1943–2011), developed cancer care and radiation therapy in India
Nadirshaw Edulji Dinshaw (1842–1914), eldest son of the Karachi landowner and philanthropist Seth Edulji Dinshaw
Rusi Dinshaw (1928–2014), Pakistani cricketer
Seth Edulji Dinshaw CIE (1842–1914), Karachi-based Parsi philanthropist during the British colonial era

Given name
Cowasji Dinshaw Adenwalla CIE (1827–1900), trader who emigrated from Surat/Bombay
Dinshaw Bilimoria (1904–1942), Indian actor and director
Dinshaw Eduljee (1919–1944), the first pilot of the Indian Air Force, IAF, to receive the Air Force Cross
Dinshaw Patel, structural biologist in New York City
Bomanjee Dinshaw Petit (1859–1915), son of Sir Dinshaw Maneckjee Petit and a cotton mill owner and philanthropist from Bombay
Dinshaw Maneckji Petit (1823–1901), Parsi entrepreneur, philanthropist and founder of the first textile mills in India
Dinshaw Edulji Wacha (1844–1936), Parsi politician from Bombay

See also
Dinshaw Wachha Road, road between two of the most poshest localities in town, which are Churchgate and Mantralaya
Edulji Dinshaw Dispensary, a building in the Saddar neighborhood of central Karachi, Pakistan
Dan Shaw
Denshaw
Dunshah